The Nobel Prize in Chemistry is awarded annually by the Royal Swedish Academy of Sciences to scientists in the various fields of chemistry. It is one of the five Nobel Prizes established by the will of Alfred Nobel in 1895, awarded for outstanding contributions in chemistry, physics, literature, peace, and physiology or medicine. This award is administered by the Nobel Foundation, and awarded by the Royal Swedish Academy of Sciences on proposal of the Nobel Committee for Chemistry which consists of five members elected by the Academy. The award is presented in Stockholm at an annual ceremony on 10 December, the anniversary of Nobel's death.

The first Nobel Prize in Chemistry was awarded in 1901 to Jacobus Henricus van 't Hoff, of the Netherlands, "for his discovery of the laws of chemical dynamics and osmotic pressure in solutions". From 1901 to 2022, the award has been bestowed on a total of 189 individuals. The 2022 Nobel Prize in Chemistry was awarded to Carolyn R. Bertozzi, Morten P. Meldal, and Karl Barry Sharpless for the development of click chemistry and bioorthogonal chemistry.  only eight women had won the prize: Marie Curie, her daughter Irène Joliot-Curie, Dorothy Hodgkin (1964), Ada Yonath (2009), Frances Arnold (2018), Emmanuelle Charpentier and Jennifer Doudna (2020), and Carolyn R. Bertozzi (2022).

Background
Alfred Nobel stipulated in his last will and testament that his money be used to create a series of prizes for those who confer the "greatest benefit on mankind" in physics, chemistry, peace, physiology or medicine, and literature. Though Nobel wrote several wills during his lifetime, the last was written a little over a year before he died, and signed at the Swedish-Norwegian Club in Paris on 27 November 1895. Nobel bequeathed 94% of his total assets, 31 million Swedish kronor (US$198 million, €176 million in 2016), to establish and endow the five Nobel Prizes. Due to the level of skepticism surrounding the will, it was not until 26 April 1897 that it was approved by the Storting (Norwegian Parliament). The executors of his will were Ragnar Sohlman and Rudolf Lilljequist, who formed the Nobel Foundation to take care of Nobel's fortune and organise the prizes.

The members of the Norwegian Nobel Committee that were to award the Peace Prize were appointed shortly after the will was approved. The prize-awarding organisations followed: the Karolinska Institutet on 7 June, the Swedish Academy on 9 June, and the Royal Swedish Academy of Sciences on 11 June. The Nobel Foundation then reached an agreement on guidelines for how the Nobel Prize should be awarded. In 1900, the Nobel Foundation's newly created statutes were promulgated by King Oscar II. According to Nobel's will, The Royal Swedish Academy of Sciences were to award the Prize in Chemistry.

Award ceremony

The committee and institution serving as the selection board for the prize typically announce the names of the laureates in October. The prize is then awarded at formal ceremonies held annually on 10 December, the anniversary of Alfred Nobel's death.  "The highlight of the Nobel Prize Award Ceremony in Stockholm is when each Nobel Laureate steps forward to receive the prize from the hands of His Majesty the King of Sweden. The Nobel Laureate receives three things: a diploma, a medal and a document confirming the prize amount" ("What the Nobel Laureates Receive").  Later the Nobel Banquet is held in Stockholm City Hall.

A maximum of three laureates and two different works may be selected. The award can be given to a maximum of three recipients per year. It consists of a gold medal, a diploma, and a cash grant.

Nomination and selection

The Nobel Laureates in chemistry are selected by a committee that consists of five members elected by the Royal Swedish Academy of Sciences. In its first stage, several thousand people are asked to nominate candidates. These names are scrutinized and discussed by experts until only the laureates remain. This slow and thorough process, is arguably what gives the prize its importance.

Forms, which amount to a personal and exclusive invitation, are sent to about three thousand selected individuals to invite them to submit nominations. The names of the nominees are never publicly announced, and neither are they told that they have been considered for the Prize. Nomination records are sealed for fifty years. In practice, some nominees do become known. It is also common for publicists to make such a claim – founded or not.

The nominations are screened by committee, and a list is produced of approximately two hundred preliminary candidates. This list is forwarded to selected experts in the field. They remove all but approximately fifteen names. The committee submits a report with recommendations to the appropriate institution.

While posthumous nominations are not permitted, awards can occur if the individual died in the months between the nomination and the decision of the prize committee.

The award in chemistry requires  the significance of achievements being recognized is "tested by time". In practice it means that the lag between the discovery and the award is typically on the order of 20 years and can be much longer. As a downside of this approach, not all scientists live long enough for their work to be recognized. Some important scientific discoveries are never considered for a Prize, as the discoverers may have died by the time the impact of their work is realized.

Prizes
A Chemistry Nobel Prize laureate earns a gold medal, a diploma bearing a citation, and a sum of money.

Nobel Prize medals
The Nobel Prize medals, minted by Myntverket in Sweden and the Mint of Norway since 1902, are registered trademarks of the Nobel Foundation. Each medal feature an image of Alfred Nobel in left profile on the obverse (front side of the medal). The Nobel Prize medals for Physics, Chemistry, Physiology or Medicine, and Literature have identical obverses, showing the image of Alfred Nobel and the years of his birth and death (1833–1896). Nobel's portrait also appears on the obverse of the Nobel Peace Prize medal and the Medal for the Prize in Economics, but with a slightly different design. The image on the reverse of a medal varies according to the institution awarding the prize. The reverse sides of the Nobel Prize medals for Chemistry and Physics share the same design.

Nobel Prize diplomas
Nobel laureates receive a diploma directly from the hands of the King of Sweden. Each diploma is uniquely designed by the prize-awarding institutions for the laureate that receives it. The diploma contains a picture and text which states the name of the laureate and normally a citation of why they received the prize.

Award money
At the awards ceremony, the laureate is given a document indicating the award sum. The amount of the cash award may differ from year to year, based on the funding available from the Nobel Foundation.  For example, in 2009 the total cash awarded was 10 million SEK (US$1.4 million), but in 2012, the amount was 8 million Swedish Krona, or US$1.1 million. If there are two laureates in a particular category, the award grant is divided equally between the recipients, but if there are three, the awarding committee may opt to divide the grant equally, or award half to one recipient and a quarter to each of the two others.

Nobel laureates in chemistry by nationality

Scope of award
In recent years, the Nobel Prize in Chemistry has drawn criticism from chemists who feel that the prize is more frequently awarded to non-chemists than to chemists. In the 30 years leading up to 2012, the Nobel Prize in Chemistry was awarded ten times for work classified as biochemistry or molecular biology, and once to a materials scientist. In the ten years leading up to 2012, only four prizes were awarded for work strictly in chemistry. Commenting on the scope of the award, The Economist explained that the Royal Swedish Academy of Sciences is bound by Nobel's bequest, which specifies awards only in physics, chemistry, literature, medicine, and peace. Biology was in its infancy in Nobel's day and no award was established. The Economist argued there is no Nobel Prize for mathematics either, another major discipline, and added that Nobel's stipulation of no more than three winners is not readily applicable to modern physics, where progress is typically made through huge collaborations rather than by individuals alone.

In 2020, Ioannidis et al. reported that half of the Nobel Prizes for science awarded between 1995–2017 were clustered in just a few disciplines within their broader fields. Atomic physics, particle physics, cell biology, and neuroscience dominated the two subjects outside chemistry, while molecular chemistry was the chief prize-winning discipline in its domain. Molecular chemists won 5.3% of all science Nobel Prizes during this period.

See also
 List of Nobel laureates in Chemistry
 Louisa Gross Horwitz Prize
 List of chemistry awards
 List of Nobel laureates
 Nobel laureates by country
 Priestley Medal
 Wolf Prize in Chemistry
 List of female nominees for the Nobel Prize

References

Notes

A. Until 2022

Specific

General

External links
 The Nobel Prize in Chemistry at the Nobel Foundation.
 The Nobel Prize Medal for Physics and Chemistry at the Nobel Foundation.
 "Nobel Prize for Chemistry. Front and back images of the medal. 1954".  "Source: Photo by Eric Arnold. Ava Helen and Linus Pauling Papers. Honors and Awards, 1954h2.1."  "All Documents and Media: Pictures and Illustrations", Linus Pauling and The Nature of the Chemical Bond: A Documentary History, The Valley Library, Oregon State University.  Accessed 7 December 2007.
 Graphics: National Chemistry Nobel Prize shares 1901–2009 by citizenship at the time of the award and by country of birth. From J. Schmidhuber (2010), Evolution of National Nobel Prize Shares in the 20th Century at arXiv:1009.2634v1
 "What the Nobel Laureates Receive" – Featured link in "The Nobel Prize Award Ceremonies".

 
Chemistry
Chemistry awards
Awards of the Royal Swedish Academy of Sciences